The Way of the Dragon (originally released in the United States as Return of the Dragon) is a 1972 Hong Kong martial arts action comedy film written, co-produced and directed by Bruce Lee, who also stars in the lead role. This is Lee's only complete directorial film and the last one released during his lifetime. The film co-stars Nora Miao, Robert Wall, and Wei Ping-ou, with Chuck Norris playing his debut screen role. The Way of the Dragon was released in Hong Kong on 30 December 1972, and in the United States in August 1974.

The film went on to gross an estimated  worldwide (equivalent to over  adjusted for inflation), against a tight budget of $130,000, earning a thousand times its budget. It was the highest-grossing Hong Kong film up until Lee's next film, Enter the Dragon (1973).

Plot

In Rome, Chen Ching-hua and her uncle Wang experience trouble with their restaurant from a crime boss who wants their property. When Chen refuses to give it up, the boss sends gangsters there to scare away the customers. Appealing to an uncle in Hong Kong, Chen receives help in the form of a young martial artist, Tang Lung (Bruce Lee). On his first arrival he is disoriented by his new surroundings and appears to be nothing but a country bumpkin. Disappointed, Chen asks what help he can be, but Tang confidently assures her that he is capable enough. At the restaurant, Tang learns that the staff have begun to learn karate, much to the annoyance of Quen, an employee who favors Chinese Kung Fu. Tang advises Quen to be open-minded and make use of anything that works.

Before long, the gangsters appear at the restaurant and threaten the customers away while Tang is using the bathroom. Upset by Tang's poor timing, the staff question his skill and the usefulness of his style. When the gangsters later return, the staff engage the thugs in a fight, only to be beaten. However, Tang single-handedly defeats them, causing the staff to decide to train under him. Uncle Wang warns them that the gangsters will seek revenge, but Tang vows to protect the restaurant. Chen and Tang grow closer, and she takes him on a tour of Rome, though Tang is unimpressed by the city.

Ho, the crime boss's subordinate, returns with armed men and takes the restaurant staff hostage. Ho gives Tang a ticket to Hong Kong and tells him to go back. However, when his men escort Tang outside, Tang fights back and defeats the thugs with his two nunchakus, followed by the help of the restaurant staff. Tang warns Ho not to return, and the thugs leave the restaurant. The staff celebrate their victory, but the gang boss threatens to have Tang killed unless he leaves by Chinese New Year, and Uncle Wang urges Chen to convince Tang to leave.

When Tang refuses to abandon the restaurant, an assassin tries to kill him from a nearby rooftop with a sniper rifle. Already fidgety from nearby fireworks, Tang survives the attempt. He then tracks down and defeats the assassin after tricking him into wasting his ammunition. When he returns to the apartment, he finds that Chen is gone. Assuming that Ho has kidnapped her, Tang goes to the boss' headquarters with the restaurant staff, defeating his men. Tang issues a final warning to the boss to leave the restaurant alone. The staff again celebrate, but a telegram for Tang cuts this short when they learn that he has been summoned back to Hong Kong. Tang assures them that he will not leave until the situation is resolved.

Ho hires two martial artists to challenge Tang - Japanese and European karate masters who initially refuse to work together. When the mafia boss indicates that money is no issue, Ho also recruits a world-class martial artist named Colt. Ho leads some of the restaurant staff to an isolated spot under the pretence of a truce, where the two martial artists ambush them. These initially defeat the staff, until Tang intervenes and leaves the staff to finish the last one off. Meanwhile, Ho lures Tang away to fight Colt at the Colosseum.

Left behind, Uncle Wang knifes the two remaining members of the staff, as he wants to sell the restaurant to the crime boss and return to Hong Kong a rich man. In a decisive ten-minute battle, Tang disables Colt. When Colt refuses an opportunity for mercy, Tang kills him with reluctance. Tang then places Colt's gi and black belt atop his dead body as a gesture of respect, before discovering Ho and chasing after him out of the Colosseum. As Tang and Ho return to the ambush site, the mob boss arrives and shoots both Ho and Uncle Wang. Then the police drive up, led by Chen, and arrest the boss as he tries to kill Tang.

With the matter finally resolved, Tang sets out to return to Hong Kong. As he leaves, Quen tells Chen that Tang is a loner who will never settle down.

Cast

Production
Bruce Lee formed his own production company, Concord Production Inc., with Golden Harvest founder Raymond Chow, and The Way of the Dragon was the company's first film. As well as acting as its producer, Lee also wrote the script, directed the film and played percussion on the soundtrack.

The film was originally intended as only for the Asian market, but was ultimately "responsible for maintaining the momentum of martial arts films in America". What makes it particularly memorable is the treatment of the fight in the Colosseum, with Chuck Norris making his film debut there. Lee filmed it "in long takes, framing it so that you could see their entire bodies. He used dramatic lighting, making both of them look larger-than-life."

Box office
Prior to release, the film's initial tight budget of US$130,000 was already covered by pre-sales in Taiwan alone. Upon release, the film earned 5,307,350.50 at the Hong Kong box office, beating previous records set by Lee's own films, The Big Boss and Fist of Fury, and making it the highest-grossing film of 1972 in Hong Kong. The Way of the Dragon went on to gross , making it the highest-grossing film ever in Hong Kong up until then.

In the United States and Canada, the film received a wide release in August 1974, topping the North American box office charts. At Chicago's Oriental Theater, the film drew long queues before opening, setting an all-time theater record with 4,000 tickets sold within several hours of its opening. The film grossed  within two weeks of release at the Oriental Theater. 

At two other Chicago theaters in Black neighbourhoods, the film earned  in its opening week. At a number of theaters, the film drew loud cheers from Black audiences like a prizefight, particularly during the climactic fight where audiences cheered on Lee as he fought Chuck Norris. The film earned  in US distributor rentals during its initial run.

In France, it became the eighth highest-grossing film of 1974 (below Enter the Dragon at #5 and above Fist of Fury at #12), with 4,002,004 ticket sales. In Spain, the film sold 2,345,259 tickets. In Germany, it was the 13th highest-grossing film of 1975, with  ticket sales. In Japan, the film earned  in distribution rentals, becoming the ninth highest-grossing film of 1975. In South Korea, the film sold 182,530 tickets in the capital city of Seoul. The film was also a commercial success in India when it released there in 1979. In one Bombay theater alone, New Excelsior, the film earned an estimated  in its first eight weeks.

It was the highest-grossing Hong Kong film up until Lee's next film, Enter the Dragon (1973).

Reception and legacy
Rotten Tomatoes reported a 92% favourable critics' response, commenting on Lee's work that it shows “a surprising change of pace from his usual hard-hitting action fare because it favors humor as much as it does kung-fu”. Upon release, Roger Ebert initially gave a mixed review in the Chicago Sun-Times, saying he found the plot simplistic and its conventions unbelievable but commented that "this sort of stuff is magnificently silly, and Lee, to give him credit, never tried to rise above it." Retrospective reviews have since been positive, with the film's comedy elements compared favourably to Charlie Chaplin and Jackie Chan, while the final fight between Bruce Lee and Chuck Norris is considered one of the greatest fight scenes of all time.

At the 11th Golden Horse Awards, it was judged a runner-up Best Feature Film and was recognised for Best Film Editing. Later on, it ranked #95 in Empire magazine's list "The 100 Best Films of World Cinema" in 2010. According to Gene Freese, the final fight between Lee and Norris is considered "by many to be the greatest movie fight ever" filmed. It has been listed as one of the greatest fight scenes of all time in a number of publications.
 
In 1978, following Lee's death, an exploitation sequel was released titled Way of the Dragon 2, starring Bruce Le and Bolo Yeung.

During the fight scene between Bruce Lee and Chuck Norris, Lee demonstrated and popularized a technique that would later be called the oblique kick. This technique is frequently used by several modern mixed martial arts (MMA) fighters, most notably the UFC pound-for-pound champion Jon Jones, who cited Lee as an inspiration.

See also

Bruce Lee filmography
Chuck Norris filmography
List of Hong Kong films of 1972

Notes

References

External links

猛龍過江 at the Hong Kong Movie DataBase

Bruce Lee: Way of the Dragon – slideshow by Life magazine

1972 films
1970s action comedy films
1970s martial arts comedy films
1972 comedy films
1972 martial arts films
1972 directorial debut films
Hong Kong action comedy films
Hong Kong martial arts films
Jeet Kune Do films
Karate films
Kung fu films
1970s Cantonese-language films
1970s Mandarin-language films
Concord Production Inc. films
Golden Harvest films
Films directed by Bruce Lee
Films set in Rome
Films shot in Rome
1970s Hong Kong films